Hagaman may refer to:

Hagaman (surname), a surname
Hagaman, New York